Istvan "Zoltan" Nagy (born August 19, 1955) is a former Romanian ice hockey player. He played for the Romania men's national ice hockey team at the 1980 Winter Olympics in Lake Placid.

References

1955 births
Living people
Ice hockey players at the 1980 Winter Olympics
Olympic ice hockey players of Romania
Romanian ice hockey left wingers
Romanian sportspeople of Hungarian descent